Aloeides titei, the Tite's copper, is a butterfly of the family Lycaenidae. It is found in South Africa, where it is known from the northern KwaZulu-Natal Drakensberg foothills to the hills of southern Mpumalanga.

The wingspan is 25–30 mm for males and 26–33 mm females. Adults are on wing from November to February. There is one generation per year.

References

Butterflies described in 1987
Aloeides
Endemic butterflies of South Africa